Botlikhsky District is an administrative and municipal district (raion), one of the forty-one in the Republic of Dagestan, Russia. Its administrative center is the rural locality (a selo) of Botlikh. As of the 2010 Census, the total population of the district was 54,322, with the population of Botlikh accounting for 22.4% of that number.

Administrative and municipal status
Within the framework of administrative divisions, Botlikhsky District is one of the forty-one in the Republic of Dagestan. The district is divided into nine selsoviets which comprise thirty-seven rural localities. As a municipal division, the district is incorporated as Botlikhsky Municipal District. Its nine selsoviets are incorporated as twenty rural settlements within the municipal district. The selo of Botlikh serves as the administrative center of both the administrative and municipal district.

References

Notes

Sources

Districts of Dagestan
